The 1995 Nottingham Open was a men's ATP tennis tournament held in Nottingham, Great Britain and played on outdoor grass courts. The event was part of the World Series of the 1995 ATP Tour. The tournament was held from 19 June to 25 June 1995.

Javier Frana won his first title of the year and third of his career.

Finals

Singles

 Javier Frana defeated  Todd Woodbridge, 7–6(7–4), 6–3

Doubles

 Luke Jensen /  Murphy Jensen defeated  Patrick Galbraith /  Danie Visser 6–3, 5–7, 6–4

References

External links
 ITF tournament edition details

 
Nottingham
Nottingham Open
June 1990 sports events in the United Kingdom